Chipilo, officially known as Chipilo de Francisco Javier Mina, is a small city in the state of Puebla, Mexico. The name itself derives from Náhuatl, meaning "place of the whiner". The settlement and the parish was fully founded by Italian immigrants from a prior community, in the late 19th century.

History

Chipilo in 1879 was a community named by locals Colonia Fernández Leal, and on October 2, 1882, immigrants from the northern Italian region of Veneto began to settle there. Most came from the town of Segusino and other surrounding towns in the province of Treviso. These immigrants arrived in Mexico in search of fertile land, leaving behind the poverty that was plaguing the Veneto at that time. Most of them took up cattle raising, and the dairy products of Chipilo became famous in Puebla and other regions of central Mexico. In 1899, Chipilo was declared to be a town and the "de Francisco Javier Mina" was added by an administrative order in memory of Martín Francisco Javier Mina y Larrea, but the locals continued to call it simply "Chipilo". Some Italian-Mexicans there continue to speak the  Chipilo Venetian dialect derived from the Venetian language. They fiercely defended themselves from the attack of Mexican revolutionaries in 1917.

Although the city of Puebla has grown so far as to almost absorb it, the town of Chipilo remained isolated for much of the 20th century. Thus, the "Chipileños", unlike other Italian immigrants that came to Mexico, did not blend into the Mexican culture and retained most of their traditions and their language. To this day, most of the people in Chipilo speak the Venetian of their great-grandparents. The variant spoken by the Chipileños is the 'northern Feltrino-Bellunese'. Surprisingly, it has been barely altered by Spanish, as compared to how the dialect of the northern region of Veneto has been altered by Italian. Given the number of speakers of Venetian, and even though the state government has not done so, the Chipilo Venetian can be considered a minority language in the conurbation of Puebla.

In 1982, the townspeople of Chipilo celebrated the 100th anniversary of the foundation of the city along with visitors from the Veneto region. During the celebration the city of Segusino, Italy, was declared Chipilo's Twin city.

Culture

Chipilo was founded on October 2, 1882, by Italian immigrants from the northern region of Veneto, although there were some people from Piedmont and Lombardy among the founders. They maintained their northern Italian culture.

In the words of a local writer, Eduardo Montagner Anguiano:

Most of them came from Segusino and surrounding villages in the provinces of Treviso and Belluno, like Quero, Valdobbiadene, Feltre and Maser.

People
 Eduardo Montagner Anguiano, writer.
 Martín Stefanonni Mazzocco, politician.

Twin towns – sister cities
  Segusino, Veneto
  Huatusco, Veracruz

See also

Chipilo Venetian dialect
Italian Mexican

References

Bibliography

 Sbrighi, Lucia (2018), El aumento de las uniones mixtas en Chipilo, México: actitudes y percepción identitaria en una comunidad inmigrante de origen italiano, Cuadernos Aispi, 12: 191–214, ISSN 2283-981X

Sbrighi, L., Greathouse Amador, L., Preciado Llyod (2020), "The New Perception of the Other in Chipilo, Mexico", Lengua y Migración /Language and Migration, ISSN 1889-5425,  ISSN-e 2660-7166, Vol. 12, Nº. 1, 2020, p. 7-35

External links
Description of the Venetian dialect of Chipilo, in Spanish
Story of Chipilo, and old pictures of the city, in Italian 
Brief History of Chipilo and pictures of the city, in Spanish
 Historical research on Chipilo, in Spanish
Ethnography of Chipilo, in Spanish

Populated places in Puebla
Populated places established in 1882
Ethnic enclaves in Mexico
Italian diaspora in Mexico